The Old Powder Mills was a former research centre of GSK in Kent.

History
In 1949 the site became a pharmaceutical manufacturing factory, when Menley & James bought the site, who were owned by Smith, Kline & French. In 1952 the site became wholly owned by Smith, Kline & French (SK&F), running under the name Bridge Chemicals. SK&F was based in Welwyn Garden City, and the site ran under Smith Kline & French Research, or SK&F Research. In 1989, the site became part of SmithKline Beecham.

By around 2000, when GSK was formed, around 300 people worked on the site.

Closure
GSK left the site in 2010, after announcing the closure of the site in February 2010.

Structure
It was situated in the west of Kent, off the A21, north of the River Medway, south of Hildenborough. There was around 155,000 sq ft of laboratories and office buildings. The north part of the site contained office buildings, and the South part of the site only contained laboratories.

References

External links
 New development
 Demolition

1949 establishments in England
2010 disestablishments in England
GSK plc
Pharmaceutical research institutes
Research institutes in Kent